The Canon de 90 mm Modèle 1926 was a light-caliber dual-purpose gun used as primary armament on minesweeping sloops and anti-aircraft armament on a number of French Navy cruisers and battleships during World War II.

Description
The Canon de 90 mm Modèle 1926 had an autofretted barrel and a Schneider semi-automatic breech mechanism.  These guns were carried in single and double, dual-purpose turrets.

Naval Use
Ships that carried the Canon de 90 mm Modèle 1926 include:
 Chamois-class minesweepers
 Battleship Jean Bart
 Cruiser Émile Bertin
 Elan-class minesweepers
 La Galissonnière-class cruisers
 Suffren-class cruisers

Land Use
In addition to its naval role a land based mobile heavy anti-aircraft version called the Canon de 90 mm CA Modèle 1926.  In 1939 a modified (shortened by 1 m) version was produced as the Canon de 90 mm CA Modèle 1939.  Both were produced in limited numbers and it is estimated that only seventeen were built before 1940.  Both had a two-wheeled single-axle carriage with three folding outriggers.  Guns captured by the Germans were given the designation 9 cm Flak M.39(f).

Ammunition
Ammunition was of Fixed QF type.

The gun was able to fire: 
 High Explosive - 
 Illumination - Unknown

Notes

References

External links 
http://www.navweaps.com/Weapons/WNFR_35-50_m1926.php
http://www.quarryhs.co.uk/ammotable10.html

Naval guns of France
90 mm artillery
World War II naval weapons
World War II anti-aircraft guns